Apurimacia is a genus of flowering plants in the legume family, Fabaceae. It belongs to the subfamily Faboideae. The species Apurimacia dolichocarpa is endemic to Córdoba Hills, Argentina. The species Apurimacia boliviana is used as an insecticide in Peru.

References 

Millettieae
Fabaceae genera